Fresne-lès-Reims (literally Fresne near Reims) is a former commune in the Marne department in north-eastern France. On 1 January 2017, it was merged into the new commune Bourgogne-Fresne.

See also
Communes of the Marne department

References

Fresnelesreims